Global Scouse Day is an annual celebration of the city of Liverpool which is held every year on 28 February. It is primarily based around scouse, the meat stew synonymous with the city. It sees bars, cafes and restaurants in Liverpool and around the world put scouse on the menu for the day. Scouse is also served in Liverpool schools, hospitals, and on Virgin trains nationwide. In recent years Global Scouse Day has grown to encompass Liverpool's music, art and cinema.

Origins 
Global Scouse Day began with a "scouse supper" (in a similar vein as Burns supper) with friends held every year on Liverpudlian adventurer Graham Hughes's birthday. When he left the country in December 2008, his friend Laura Worthington decided to continue the tradition in his absence.

Over the course of the following 5 years, Global Scouse Day grew from a small gathering to capturing the city's imagination with over 100 bars, restaurants and cafes putting scouse on the menu on February 28, and saw support from the Lord Mayor of Liverpool as well as Liverpool F.C. and Everton F.C.

Events 
Global Scouse Day has spawned various events including an annual "Scouse Off" competition, adjudicated over by Liverpool celebrities, a cocktail competition and at least one Guinness World Record attempt. In 2018, Liverpool writer and poet Roger McGough wrote and performed a humorous poem about the day, musing on the ingredients that could be used to make scouse in different countries around the world.

Charity 
Global Scouse Day has been used to raise funds and awareness for R Charity, The Whitechapel Centre, Clatterbridge Cancer Centre, and to provide hot, nutritious food to the city's homeless. In 2018, Virgin Trains provided 100 bowls of scouse to the Whitechapel Centre, a homeless charity based in Liverpool.

References 

Liverpool
February observances
British stews